Merya may refer to:
 Merya people
 Merya language, an extinct language
 Merya (Tanzanian ward)

See also 
 Meryan (disambiguation)
 Merja (disambiguation), pronounced "Merya"
 Meria (disambiguation)
 Marya, a tribe of Eritria